Truncatelloidea is a superfamily of snails,  gastropod mollusks in the clade Caenogastropoda.

The families are marine, brackish, freshwater and terrestrial.

Families
 Amnicolidae Tryon, 1863
 Anabathridae Keen, 1971
 Assimineidae H. Adams & A. Adams, 1856
 Bithyniidae Gray, 1857
 Bythinellidae Locard, 1893
 Caecidae Gray, 1850
 Calopiidae Ponder, 1999
 Clenchiellidae D. W. Taylor, 1966
 Cochliopidae Tryon, 1866
 Elachisinidae Ponder, 1985
 Emmericiidae Brusina, 1870
 Epigridae Ponder, 1985
 Falsicingulidae Slavoshevskaya, 1975
 Helicostoidae Pruvot-Fol, 1937
 Hydrobiidae Stimpson, 1865
 Hydrococcidae Thiele, 1928
 Iravadiidae Thiele, 1928
 Lithoglyphidae Tryon, 1866
 Lithoglyphulidae Radoman, 1973
 Moitessieriidae Bourguignat, 1863
 Pomatiopsidae Stimpson, 1865
 Spirostyliferinidae Layton, Middelfart, Tatarnic & N. G. Wilson, 2019
 Stenothyridae Tryon, 1866
 Tateidae Thiele, 1925
 Tomichiidae Wenz, 1938
 Tornidae Sacco, 1896 (1884)
 Truncatellidae Gray, 1840
 Vitrinellidae Bush, 1897 
 Unassigned to a family : Aenigmula Golding, 2014
Synonyms
 Adeorbidae Monterosato, 1884 synonym of Tornidae Sacco, 1896 (1884)
 Benedictiidae Clessin, 1880: synonym of Benedictiinae Clessin, 1880 (new rank)
 Circulidae Fretter & Graham, 1962: synonym of Vitrinellidae Bush, 1897
 Fairbankiinae Thiele, 1928: synonym of Iravadiidae Thiele, 1928
 Subfamily Hemistomiinae Thiele, 1929: synonym of Tateidae Thiele, 1925
 Hyalidae Golikov & Starobogatov, 1975: synonym of Iravadiidae Thiele, 1928
 Kolhymamnicolidae Starobogatov, 1983: synonym of Amnicolinae Tryon, 1863
 Limnoreidae B. Dybowski, 1911: synonym of Baicaliinae P. Fischer, 1885 (invalid: type genus a junior homonym)
 Paludestrinidae Newton, 1891 synonym of Hydrobiidae Stimpson, 1865
 Potamopyrgidae F. C. Baker, 1928: synonym of Tateidae Thiele, 1925
 Pseudomerelininae Starobogatov, 1989: synonym of Iravadiidae Thiele, 1928
 Pyrgulidae Brusina, 1882 (1869) synonym of Hydrobiidae Stimpson, 1865

References

External links 
 To World Register of Marine Species